The Reconstructionist Synagogue of the North Shore (also known as RSNS) is a Reconstructionist Jewish synagogue located in the Incorporated Village of Plandome in the Town of North Hempstead, in Nassau County, on the North Shore of Long Island, in New York, United States.

History 
The congregation was first founded as the Jewish Reconstructionist Society of New York in the 1950s by a group of socially-concerned and involved Jewish families. One of the key founders of the congregation was Rabbi Ira Eisenstein, who would also serve as its rabbi.

In the 1970s, the society purchased an old mansion for $137,000 on Glenwood Road in Roslyn Harbor, New York with the intention of using it as a synagogue. However, officials and residents in Roslyn Harbor refused to approve of the plans, citing issues with zoning, and the congregation ultimately took the matter to court. 

The lawsuit proved unsuccessful, and in 1977, four nearby residents gave the congregation $30,000 to sell the building for use as nothing other than a residence. The mansion was sold, and the congregation then purchased and moved into the Roslyn Union Free School District's former Highland Elementary School in the nearby village of Roslyn Estates that same year.

The congregation moved from the former Highland School in Roslyn to its current location in Plandome in October 1993, which is slightly northwest of Roslyn.

In 2007, antisemitic graffiti was found on the property. The hate incident shocked many congregants, as this was the first time the congregation was targeted at the Plandome location for 15 years at the time.

When services for the Rosh Hashanah and Yom Kippur were held virtually in 2020 due to the COVID-19 Pandemic, the temple made headlines when cardboard cutouts of congregants filled the seats in the sanctuary. The idea, which was first proposed by congregants Marvin and Barbara Schaffer, was inspired by the cardboard cutouts which the New York Mets filled the seats of Citi Field with.

Clergy

Rabbis 

 Jodie Siff
 Lee Friedlander

Rabbi Emeritus 

 Ira Eisenstein

Cantor 

 Eric Schulmiller

References

External Links 

 Official website

Manhasset, New York
Reconstructionist synagogues in the United States
Synagogues in Nassau County, New York